In music, Op. 138 stands for Opus number 138. Compositions that are assigned this number include:

 Reger – Der Mensch lebt und bestehet
 Reger – Nachtlied
 Reger – Unser lieben Frauen Traum
 Schumann – Spanische Liebeslieder
 Shostakovich – String Quartet No. 13